Chrysomela confluens is a species of leaf beetle in the family Chrysomelidae. It is found in North America.

References

Further reading

External links

 

Chrysomelinae
Articles created by Qbugbot
Beetles described in 1856